Hemisaga is a genus of insect in family Tettigoniidae. It contains the following species:
 Hemisaga elongata
 Hemisaga lucifer
 Hemisaga vepreculae

References 

Tettigoniidae genera
Taxonomy articles created by Polbot